

Princess of Condé

See also
Duchess of Bourbon
Duchess of Guise
Duchess of Enghien
Duchess of Montmorency

Princesses of Conde
Conde, princesses of
 
Conde, princesses of
 Princesses of Conde
Conde, princesses of
Conde, princesses of
Conde, princesses of
Conde, princesses of
Princesses of France (Bourbon)
Lists of princesses